Tokkei Security Hiratsuka General Gymnasium is an arena in Hiratsuka, Kanagawa, Japan.This is an anime spot based on Slam Dunk (manga).

References

Basketball venues in Japan

Indoor arenas in Japan
1982 establishments in Japan
Sports venues completed in 1982
Sports venues in Kanagawa Prefecture
Toshiba Kawasaki Brave Thunders
Yokohama B-Corsairs
Hiratsuka, Kanagawa